Bubble O' Bill is a brand of packaged frozen dessert sold in Australia and New Zealand, manufactured under Unilever's Streets brand, and formerly available in the United States and United Kingdom under sister brands Good Humor and Wall's respectively.

Its name a pun on Old West figure Buffalo Bill, the ice cream resembles a cowboy, distinctive for having a gumball in place of a nose.

Composition 

The Bubble O' Bill is a moulded ice cream on a stick, resembling a cowboy with a large hat, "Bill". Three flavours of ice cream are used to form the details of a Bubble O' Bill, strawberry for the face, caramel moustache details, and a chocolate hat, with a hole resembling a gunshot. The reverse of the ice cream is coated with a layer of dark chocolate.

In the place of a nose, a gumball is used, giving the product its name. While its packaging depicts the Bubble O' Bill character with a pink nose, and most marketing shows the product with a green gumball, a variety of colours can be found. The gumball also formerly featured printed "wild west" sayings, such as "Go for your guns" and, "It's a hoe-down".

History 

The Bubble O' Bill was first introduced into the US market in 1985 by New Jersey company Good Humor, but achieved particular success in Australia, where it continues to be available, popular for its unique shape and bubblegum nose.

For a period of time, a similar product depicting popular television character Agro with a bubblegum nose was produced by Pauls.

Popular culture 
Australian musical comedy trio Tripod have performed a song suggesting Bubble O' Bill's possible hero status.

References

External links
 Bubble O' Bill on the Streets Australia website
 

Australian cuisine
Australian confectionery
Australian brands
Ice cream brands
Unilever brands
Australian mascots